Oak Park railway station is located on the Craigieburn line in Victoria, Australia. It serves the northern Melbourne suburb of Oak Park, and opened on 13 August 1956.

History
Oak Park station opened on 13 August 1956, with the railway line past the site of the station opening in 1872, as part of the North East line to School House Lane. Like the suburb itself, the station was named after a property that was renamed after it was purchased from the widow of John Pascoe Fawkner in 1879. Fawkner originally purchased 316 hectares of land, including the area now known as Oak Park, in 1839.

In 1962, boom barriers replaced hand-operated gates at the Devon Road level crossing, located nearby in the Up direction of the station. In 1965, a number of signals at the station were abolished, in conjunction with the replacement of double line block signalling with three-position signalling between Broadmeadows and Essendon.

In 1989, the station was damaged by fire. In 1994, it was provided with CCTV.

Platforms and services
Oak Park has two side platforms. It is served by Craigieburn line trains.

Platform 1:
  all stations services to Flinders Street

Platform 2:
  all stations services to Craigieburn

Gallery

References

External links
 Melway map at street-directory.com.au

Railway stations in Melbourne
Railway stations in Australia opened in 1956
Railway stations in the City of Merri-bek